Thori Si Wafa Chahiye is a Pakistani television series directed by Yasir Nawaz, written by Syed Wasi Shah, and first broadcast on Geo Entertainment. It stars Iffat Rahim, Sajid Hasan, and Mehwish Hayat in the lead roles. The series is based on extra-marital affairs.

The series received two nominations at the 11th Lux Style Awards, including Best TV Actor for Hasan and Best TV Director.

Plot 
There is a lack of understanding between the married couple, Rania and Sheraz. Sheraz is a corrupt government officer and has two children from Rania. The dispute between them and arrogant nature of Sheraz results in divorce. He later marries his beautiful and young colleague, Mehreen, who belongs to a poor family. Rania also moves on in her life and marries a nice guy, Jasim. On the other hand, Sheraz is then dismissed due to corruption charges. To save his assets from confiscation, he transfers his assets to his new father-in-law. After several investigations, he is sent to prison but later comes out after making a deal, according to which he is terminated permanently from the job. He goes to Mehreen who has now started an affair with Sheraz's assistant and asks for his property back, which she denies.

Cast 
 Iffat Rahim as Rania
 Sajid Hasan as Sheraz
 Mehwish Hayat as Mehreen
 Adnan Siddiqui as Jasim
 Akhtar Hasnain as Arif
 Shamoon Abbasi as Police
 Qaiser Naqvi as Dadi

Reception 
Dawn praised the performances of the lead cast, especially of Hasan's acting, but criticised the violent scenes.

Accolades

References 

Geo TV original programming
Pakistani television series